Jennifer Manuel is a Canadian novelist and short-story writer. She has published one literary novel and three books for young readers. Her debut novel The Heaviness of Things That Float won the Ethel Wilson Fiction Prize in 2017. She has published two middle-grade sports novels including Dressed to Play and Head to Head, which was nominated for The Red Cedar Awards in 2021. Her young adult novel, Open Secrets, addresses grooming in the music industry. She has also published short stories in The Fiddlehead, Prism International, and Room Magazine. Her short story, "Urchin," was a Western Magazine finalist.

Born in Toronto, Canada, she grew up in White Rock, British Columbia. She is the daughter of children's author Lynn Manuel. She currently resides on Vancouver Island, where she teaches English and is the Head of Indigenous Initiatives and Engagement at Shawnigan Lake School. She is the Founder of the TRC Reading Challenge, an initiative that encourages all Canadians to read the TRC Report.

Bibliography

References

21st-century Canadian novelists
Canadian women novelists
Writers from British Columbia
Living people
21st-century Canadian women writers
1971 births
University of British Columbia alumni